Cambli Group inc. Thunder 1 is an armored police tactical vehicle built by Cambli Group Tactical & Military Division of Saint-Jean-sur-Richelieu, Quebec, Canada.

The 4 × 4 wheeled light armored vehicle (LAV) is based on the company's armored car platform using International 7500 SFA chassis. Armour-plated body and bullet-proof glass gives the vehicle ballistic protection from high-caliber weapons.

The vehicle is being marketed to civilian agencies or police forces in Canada and the United States. Thunder 1 targets law enforcement agencies looking for a reliable vehicle that is built on a real truck platform, the Thunder 1 is a 100% legal platform built within limits of the chassis and the axles.

Operators

So far these are the users of this vehicle

 Vancouver Police Department – 1 delivered in 2010 from tender after 2008
 York Regional Police – 1 delivered in 2011
 Ontario Provincial Police – 2 delivered in 2012
 Service de police de la Ville de Québec – 1 delivered in 2012
 Service de police de la Ville de Montréal – 1 delivered in 2013
 Calgary Police Service – 1 delivered in 2019

See also

Similar armored vehicles include:

 Alvis Saracen
 Saxon (vehicle)
 Cadillac Gage Ranger
 Mercedes-Benz Unimog U5000
 Armored car (military)
 Armored car (VIP)

References

Sources
Data
Description
 Info
The Star

External links
 Cambli Tactical and Military

Military trucks
Military vehicles of Canada
Military vehicles introduced in the 2010s
Motor vehicle manufacturers based in Quebec